Cannula, used alone or in combination with other words, has several meanings. It derives from the Latin "little reed"; and often refers to a tube.

Technology and medicine
 Cannula
Nasal cannula
Cannula transfer
Karman cannula
 Cannulated cow
 Cannulated screws (orthopedic implants)
 Cannula transfer or cannulation, a subset of air-free techniques used with a Schlenk line

Zoology
 Cannula is a genus of straw-mimicking grasshoppers in the family Acrididae

See also
Cannuli (surname)